John McDonell (born 13 May 1943) is an Australian former professional rugby league footballer who played in the 1960s and 1970s.

Playing career
McDonell began his career with Northern Beaches club Manly in 1965 and spent three seasons with them before joining arch rivals North Sydney in 1968.  McDonell spent five seasons with North Sydney but the club never qualified for the finals in his time there.  In 1973, McDonell became the captain of Canterbury-Bankstown and in 1974 the club reached the grand final against Eastern Suburbs.  The first half of the match was a tight affair with Easts leading Canterbury 7–4 at the break before storming home in the second half to win 19–4.  This would be McDonell's last ever game and he retired following the grand final defeat.

References

1943 births
Australian rugby league players
Canterbury-Bankstown Bulldogs players
North Sydney Bears players
Manly Warringah Sea Eagles players
Rugby league locks
Rugby league second-rows
Living people